Wesley John Chowen (born May 25, 1939) is a former American cyclist. He competed at the 1960 Summer Olympics and the 1964 Summer Olympics.

References

External links
 

1939 births
Living people
American male cyclists
Olympic cyclists of the United States
Cyclists at the 1960 Summer Olympics
Cyclists at the 1964 Summer Olympics
Sportspeople from Santa Monica, California
Pan American Games medalists in cycling
Pan American Games bronze medalists for the United States
Medalists at the 1967 Pan American Games